Thalian Hall is a historic city hall and theatre located at Wilmington, New Hanover County, North Carolina. It was built in 1858, and is a two-story, five bay, stuccoed brick building with a combination of restrained Classical Revival and flamboyant Late Victorian design elements.  The front facade features a tetrastyle Corinthian order portico.  The Thalian Hall theater ceased to provide a stage for professional shows after 1928.  The building has been under the management of the Thalian Hall Center for the Performing Arts, Inc. since 1963.

It was listed on the National Register of Historic Places in 1970. It is located in the Wilmington Historic District.

References

External links

Thalian Hall Center for the Performing Arts website

Theatres on the National Register of Historic Places in North Carolina
City and town halls on the National Register of Historic Places in North Carolina
Neoclassical architecture in North Carolina
Victorian architecture in North Carolina
Government buildings completed in 1858
Buildings and structures in Wilmington, North Carolina
National Register of Historic Places in New Hanover County, North Carolina
City and town halls in North Carolina
Individually listed contributing properties to historic districts on the National Register in North Carolina
Music venues in North Carolina
Theatres in North Carolina